In the Beginning is a 2000 American two-part biblical television miniseries directed by Kevin Connor. It stars Martin Landau and Jacqueline Bisset and originally aired on NBC on November 12 and 13, 2000.

Plot
In the Beginning is the story about the travels and travails of the tribe of Abraham (Martin Landau). Set around the year 2000 B.C., the narrative opens with "Genesis 12," wherein the  has told Abraham and company to leave their country to a land of milk and honey to be named later. In order to keep up the morale of his followers while on the road, Abraham gives a sermon that sums up God's creation of the universe. By illustrating this sermon with stock footage and special-effects shots, the producers attempt to make a connection between sermons of old and popular entertainments of today. From there, the twists and turns of the Old Testament are treated like a soap opera. Family dramas take center stage, whether it's God testing Abraham by telling him to kill his son in sacrifice, Joseph gaining power in Egypt after being sold to slave traders by his brothers, or one of the many other stories of brothers fighting (Cain and Abel, Isaac and Ishmael, etc.). Many events are visualized such as the plagues and the parting of the Red Sea, to name but two.

Cast
 Martin Landau as Abraham
 Jacqueline Bisset as Sarah
 Billy Campbell as Moses
 Eddie Cibrian as Joseph
 Fred Weller as Jacob
 Alan Bates as Jethro
 Steven Berkoff as Potiphar
 Geraldine Chaplin as Jochebed
 Amanda Donohoe as Zuleika
 Christopher Lee as Ramesses I
 Art Malik as Ramesses II
 Rachael Stirling as Young Rebeccah
 Diana Rigg as Mature Rebeccah
 Victor Spinetti as Happatezoah
 David Threlfall as Aaron
 David Warner as Eliezer
 Terri Seymour as Eve
 Sendhil Ramamurthy as Adam
 Sean Pertwee as Isaac
 Andrew Grainger as Esau
 Jonathan Firth as Joshua
 Danny Webb as Laban
 Frank Finlay as God's voice (uncredited)
 Archie Panjabi as Basya

References

External links 
 

2000s American television miniseries
Films shot in Hungary
Films shot in Budapest
Films shot in Morocco
Films based on the Book of Genesis
Films set in Turkey
Films set in ancient Egypt
Films set in the 13th century BC
2000 television films
2000 films
NBC network original films
Cultural depictions of Adam and Eve
Cultural depictions of Abraham
Cultural depictions of Moses
Cultural depictions of Ramesses II
Cultural depictions of Isaac
Fiction about God
Films directed by Kevin Connor